Biel Farrés del Castillo (born 1 May 2002) is a Spanish footballer who plays as a central defender for Girona FC B.

Club career
Born in Vic, Barcelona, Catalonia, Farrés joined FC Barcelona's La Masia in 2011, from hometown side Vic Riuprimer REFO FC. He remained at the club until 2017, and subsequently represented Club Gimnàstic Manresa and CF Damm as a youth.

In July 2021, after finishing his formation, Farrés joined Girona FC and was assigned to the reserves in the Tercera División RFEF. He made his senior debut on 5 September, starting in a 2–1 away win over CE L'Hospitalet.

Farrés scored his first senior goal on 28 November 2021, netting the B's only goal in a 1–0 home success over FE Grama. He made his first team debut the following 6 January, starting in a 1–0 home win over CA Osasuna in the season's Copa del Rey.

International career 
Farrés was a part of the Catalan under-16 selection in 2017 and 2018.

References

External links
 
 
 

2002 births
Living people
Footballers from Vic
Spanish footballers
Association football defenders
Segunda División players
Tercera Federación players
Girona FC B players
Girona FC players